What If... is an American web series that acts as a crossover among three ABC soap operas, General Hospital, All My Children and One Life to Live. The ten-part series was originally streamed on ABC.com from July 12 to August 30, 2010. It won a Daytime Emmy Award for New Approaches - Daytime Entertainment.

Production
ABC announced that a web series would crossover their three soap operas in June 2010. The first episode was made available on ABC.com on July 12, 2010. One Life to Live executive producer Frank Valentini directed the ten-part series. What If... revolved around characters from two of the three series meeting each other and interacting in a shared alternate reality, not in continuity with any of the series.

Cast
Each episode features two cast members from either General Hospital, All My Children, or One Life to Live. The following is a list of featured cast members.

Susan Lucci as Erica Kane
Maurice Benard as Sonny Corinthos
Laura Wright as Carly Corinthos
Cameron Mathison as Ryan Lavery
Steve Burton as Jason Morgan
Rebecca Budig as Greenlee Smythe
Kelly Monaco as Sam McCall
Michael Easton as John McBain
Trevor St. John as Todd Manning
Bradford Anderson as Damian Spinelli
Kassie DePaiva as Blair Cramer
Michael E. Knight as Tad Martin
Dominic Zamprogna as Dante Falconeri
Bree Williamson as Tess Buchanan
Debbi Morgan as Angie Hubbard
Darnell Williams as Jesse Hubbard
Kristen Alderson as Starr Manning
Kirsten Storms as Maxie Jones
John-Paul Lavoisier as Rex Balsom
Erika Slezak as Viki Lord
Anthony Geary as Luke Spencer

Episodes

References

All My Children
General Hospital
One Life to Live
American drama web series
Internet soap operas